La Crosse USD 395 is a public unified school district headquartered in La Crosse, Kansas, United States.  The district includes the communities of Alexander, La Crosse, Liebenthal, McCracken, Rush Center, Hargrave, Nekoma, and nearby rural areas.

Schools
The school district operates the following schools:
 La Crosse Junior-Senior High School.
 La Cross Elementary School.

See also
 Kansas State Department of Education
 Kansas State High School Activities Association
 List of high schools in Kansas
 List of unified school districts in Kansas

References

External links
 

School districts in Kansas
Rush County, Kansas